The men's tournament at the 2017 World Team Ninepin Bowling Classic Championships was held in Dettenheim, Germany from 21 to 27 May 2017.

Serbia captured their fourth title by defeating Hungary 6-2 in the final match. Bronze medals was secured by Slovakia and host Germany.

Participating teams

Draw

Groups

Group stage

Group A 

|}

Group B 

|}

Group C 

|}

Group D 

|}

Final Round

Bracket

Quarterfinals

Semifinals

Final

Final standing

Footnotes

References 

World Team Ninepin Bowling Classic Championships - Men's tournaments
2017 World Team Ninepin Bowling Classic Championships